Agnéby Region is a defunct region of Ivory Coast. From 1997 to 2011, it was a first-level subdivision region. The region's capital was Agboville and its area was 9,234 km2. Since 2011, the area formerly encompassed by the region is part of Lagunes District.

Administrative divisions
At the time of its dissolution, Agnéby Region was divided into four departments: Adzopé, Agboville, Akoupé, and Yakassé-Attobrou.

Abolition
Agnéby Region was abolished as part of the 2011 administrative reorganisation of the subdivisions of Ivory Coast. The area formerly encompassed by the region is part of two regions of Lagunes District. The territory of the department of Agboville was combined with the former Lagunes Region's departments of Sikensi and Tiassalé to form Agnéby-Tiassa Region. The territory of the remaining departments, Adzopé, Akoupé, and Yakassé-Attobrou, was combined with the former Lagunes Region's department of Alépé to form La Mé Region.

Notes

Former regions of Ivory Coast
States and territories disestablished in 2011
2011 disestablishments in Ivory Coast
1997 establishments in Ivory Coast
States and territories established in 1997